Jester Interactive is a video game developer based in North Wales in the United Kingdom. It was founded in 1997 as a trading arm of Morgan Computing Limited. It would later trade under the name Jester Interactive Limited, and after going into administration in 2003, it would re-emerge as Jester Interactive Publishing Limited.

History
Jester Interactive Limited was formed as part of a Database Software company based in North Wales, through funding from Morgan Computing Limited. The key staff who initiated this venture were Lee Wright, Tim Wright and Gavin Morgan, managing director of Morgan Computing Limited.

Jester Interactive initially consisted of a small team of five people working in offices based at Liverpool's Port of Liverpool Building where they developed the company's first title NoiseToys. NoiseToys was later renamed as Music Station, then shortened to Music with the strapline Music Creation for the PlayStation Generation. This line of software also featured a DJ Character known as 'Scratchy' which usually appeared on all Jester's Music products.

After about 9 months, Jester launched its first title MUSIC™ through Codemasters to critical acclaim. As the winners of the Official PlayStation Magazine award for the Most Innovative Game 1999 and Sony Computer Entertainment America's award for Most Innovative Game 2000, Jester also twice reached final nomination for the highly acclaimed BAFTA awards in the category of the user interface. Jester went on to develop several racing games involving Super Trucks and the Isle of Man TT races.

In 2000 Jester won the Achievement Wales 2000 Business of the Year Award from the Daily Post / Wales 2000 initiative.

In 2001 it was ranked No. 4 in the Fast Growth 50 company list.

Jester's most recent titles include TT Superbikes Real Road Racing and TT Superbikes Legends. They are currently working on titles which have yet to be revealed.

Games developed

References

External links
Official Jester Interactive Website
Codemasters MUSIC 2000 forum
Interview with bike racer Paul Owen, Regarding Jester Bike Racing Game
BBC News Article - Jester Interactive Computer game is Wales Creative IP Fund's first new media investment

Video game companies established in 1997
Video game companies of the United Kingdom
British companies established in 1997
Video game development companies